Sir Thomas Hervey (1625 – 27 May 1694) was an English Commissioner of the Royal Navy, landed gentleman, and Member of Parliament for Bury St Edmunds.

Life
Hervey was born in 1625, the third son of Sir William Hervey (1585–1660) of Ickworth, Suffolk, by his marriage in 1612 to Susan Jermyn, a daughter of Sir Robert Jermyn. 

On 3 April 1641, aged fifteen, Hervey was admitted to Pembroke College, Cambridge, as a pensioner, but did not take a degree. He became a Justice of the Peace for Suffolk, an Alderman of the corporation of Bury St Edmunds, and from 1664 to 1668 was a Commissioner of the Royal Navy.

In his role at the Navy Board, Hervey held a political appointment and in practice did very little, like the other Commissioners leaving the actual work to their Secretary, Samuel Pepys. By 1665, Hervey had been knighted. In his diary for 7 June 1665, Pepys recorded a merry dinner at the Dolphin Tavern with Hervey, Sir John Mennes, and Lord Brouncker, saying of it "very merry we were, Sir Thomas Harvy being a very drolle." On 10 February 1666, as the Great Plague of London was abating, Pepys noted "This day comes first Sir Thomas Harvy after the plague, having been out of towne all this while. He was coldly received by us..." On 7 November of that year, Pepys wrote dismissively of Hervey "... but a coxcombe he is and will never be better in the business of the Navy."  When Hervey resigned his commission, Charles II gave him a generous royal bounty.

On 18 January 1679, with the death of his childless  elder brother John Hervey (born 1616), Hervey inherited the Ickworth estate, and the same year became one of the two members of parliament for Bury. With the accession of James II, he was part of the opposition to the new king in parliament.

Family
In May 1658, he married Isabella, a daughter of Sir Humphrey May, of Carrow Abbey, Norfolk.

Death
He died on 27 May 1694.

References

1625 births
1694 deaths
Alumni of Pembroke College, Cambridge
English MPs 1679
English MPs 1680–1681
English MPs 1681
English MPs 1685–1687
English MPs 1689–1690
English justices of the peace
Thomas
Knights Bachelor
Politicians from Bury St Edmunds